Carbonaceous sulfur hydride is a purported room-temperature superconductor that was announced in October 2020. In September 2022 the article was retracted by Nature journal editorial board due to a non standard, user-defined data analysis calling into question the scientific validity of the claim.   

267 GPa corresponds to a pressure equivalent to three quarters of the pressure at the center of the Earth. The material is an uncharacterized ternary polyhydride compound of carbon, sulfur and hydrogen with a chemical formula that is thought to be CH8S. Measurements under extreme pressure are difficult, and in particular the elements are too light for an X-ray determination of crystal structure (X-ray crystallography). This would be the closest to room temperature achieved for a superconductor, with an onset almost 30 °C higher than that of the previous record-holder.

Background 

Prior to 1911, all known electrical conductors exhibited electrical resistance, due to collisions of the charge carrier with atoms in the material. Researchers discovered that in certain materials at low temperatures, the charge carriers interact with phonons in the material and form Cooper pairs, as described by BCS theory. This process results in the formation of a superconductor, with zero electrical resistance. During the transition to the superconducting state, the magnetic field lines are expelled from the interior of the material, which allows for the possibility of magnetic levitation. The effect has historically been known to occur at only low temperatures, but researchers have spent decades attempting to find a material that could operate at room temperature.

Synthesis 

The material is a ternary polyhydride compound of carbon, sulfur and hydrogen with a chemical formula that is thought to be CSH8. As of October 2020, the material's molecular structure remains uncharacterized, as extreme pressures and the light elements used are unsuitable for most measurements, such as X-ray determination. The material is synthesized by compressing methane (CH4), hydrogen sulfide (H2S) and hydrogen (H2) in a diamond anvil cell and illuminating with a 532 nm green laser. A starting compound of carbon and sulfur is synthesized with a 1:1 molar ratio, formed into balls less than five microns in diameter, and placed into a diamond anvil cell. Hydrogen gas is then added and the system is compressed to 4.0 GPa and illuminated with a 532-nm laser for several hours. It was reported that the crystal is not stable under 10 GPa and can be destroyed if left at room temperature overnight. Research into the material is ongoing and, as of January 2022, they discovered by using the minimal hopping structure prediction method coupled to the GPU-accelerated sirius library, only 24 stoichiometries are favorable against elemental decomposition, and all of them are carbon-doped H3S crystals. The absence of van Hove singularities or similar peaks in the electronic density of states of more than 3000 candidate phases rules out conventional superconductivity in C-S-H at room temperature.

Superconductivity 

On 14 October 2020, a paper was published claiming that carbonaceous sulfur hydride is the world's first room-temperature superconductor. The report received significant media coverage. This would set a new record for high-temperature superconductivity, with a transition temperature almost  higher than the previous record holder. With a reported superconducting transition of 15 °C, it would be the first material known which does not have to be cooled to enter a superconducting phase.

In addition, as expected from BCS theory, a notable decrease in the transition temperature was reported when an external magnetic field is applied.

On 26 September 2022 this paper was retracted.

Superconductivity for sulfur hydrides without carbon was first reported in 2015.

Criticism 
The validity of these results has been called into question mainly by Jorge E. Hirsch as well as others. Unavailability of the data prompted an editor's note on the original paper. The criticism focuses on the measurements of AC susceptibility 

used to test the superconductivity as the more definitive Meissner effect is too hard to observe at the scale of the experiments; nevertheless this effect has been measured later on sulfur hydrides without carbon by another team but those results have also been called into question.  
On February 15, 2022, Nature added the following Editor's Note to the article reporting room temperature superconductivity in carbonaceous sulfur hydride:"The editors of Nature have been alerted to concerns regarding the manner in which the data in this paper have been processed and interpreted. Nature is working with the authors to investigate these concerns and establish what (if any) impact they will have on the paper’s results and conclusions. In the meantime, readers are advised to use caution when using results reported therein."The original article by Snider et al.  was finally retracted by Nature editorial board on 26 September 26, 2022 while the authors of the study are still claiming its validity.

References

External links
 

Hydrogen compounds
Superconductors
High-temperature superconductors
2020 in science
Sulfur compounds
Carbon compounds
Scientific controversies